"On Purpose" is a song recorded by American singer Sabrina Carpenter from her second studio album Evolution (2016), served as the opening track of the album. The track was written by Carpenter and its producer Ido Zmishlany. The song was released by Hollywood Records as the lead single from Evolution and it was premiered on July 29, 2016. A dance track, "On Purpose" talks about a relationship that was not supposed to happen. It was accompanied by a music video directed by James Miller premiered on her Vevo channel on August 12, 2016. It featured Carpenter walking and touring London.

Background and recording
On July 22, 2016, Carpenter revealed on her social media that the song will be released on July 29, sharing two snippets. Earlier that week, she had already teased "big music" coming soon.

In addition to producing "On Purpose", Ido Zmishlany engineered the track and do the additional vocal engineering. Nolan Wescott played the piano and do the vocal engineering. Serban Ghenea mixed the track and Chris Gehringer did the audio mastering at Sterling Sound in New York. The vocals were recorded at UMPG Studios in Santa Monica and the additional vocals were recorded at Faculty Studios.

Composition
Musically, "On Purpose" lasts three minutes and fifty-eight seconds. In terms of music notation, "On Purpose" was composed using  common time in the key of D minor, with a moderately tempo of 100 beats per minute. The song follows the chord progression of Gm/B–Dm-C-Gm-Gm/B–Dm-C in the verses, B-C-Dm-Cadd4 in the pre-chorus and Dm-C-F-B in the chorus. Carpenter's vocal range spans from the low note F3 to the high note of D5, giving the song one octaves and five notes of range.

Music video
The music video was directed by James Miller. It was premiered on August 12, 2016. The music video shows her skipping around the streets of London. It was supposed to include her Girl Meets World co-star Corey Fogelmanis, but his scenes didn't make the final cut.

Critical reception
Brittany Goldfield Rodrigues of Andpop said "The lead single off of the record hinted at more of an indie sounding Sabrina — matched with the same emotional lyrics and powerful vocals. The sweet and endearing love song is the perfect balance between ballad and up-tempo dance track. The lovely lyrics and beat-heavy chorus make for the perfect unique track to set the tone for the record".

Live performances
Carpenter performed the song on the Honda Stage at the iHeartRadio Theater in Los Angeles on August 25, 2016, along with other new music before the release of Evolution.

Credits and personnel 
Recording and management
Recorded at UMPG Studios (Santa Monica, California)
Additional vocals recorded at Faculty Studios
Mastered at Sterling Sound (New York City)
Seven Summits Music (BMI) obo Itself and Pink Mic Music (BMI), Songs of Universal, Inc/Music of Liberal Arts Publishing/Zmishlany Music (BMI)

Personnel

Sabrina Carpenter – lead vocals, songwriting
Ido Zmishlany – songwriting, production, engineering, additional vocal engineering
Nolan Wescott – piano, vocal engineering
Serban Ghenea – mixing
Chris Gehringer – mastering

Credits adapted from Evolution liner notes.

Charts

Awards and nominations

Release history

References

2016 singles
2016 songs
Sabrina Carpenter songs
Songs written by Ido Zmishlany
Hollywood Records singles
Songs written by Sabrina Carpenter